Annapurna Sharma, also known as Anna Sharma, is a Nepalese film actress. She debuted with the film Jerryy opposite Anmol K.C. Her second film was Gangster Blues opposite Aashirman DS Joshi. Her third, The Man from Kathmandu, featured a cast of international and Nepalese actors including Gulshan Grover, Hameed Sheikh, Jose Manuel, Michael Brian, Karma Shakya, Neer Shah, and Mithila Sharma.

Family
She has two sisters, Amilia Sharma and Ahliya Sharma.

Filmography

Awards

References

Living people
Actors from Kathmandu
21st-century Nepalese actresses
Year of birth missing (living people)